Psenopsis is a genus of medusafishes native to the Indian Ocean and the western Pacific Ocean.

Species
There are currently six recognized species in this genus:
 Psenopsis anomala (Temminck & Schlegel, 1844) (Pacific rudderfish)
 Psenopsis cyanea (Alcock, 1890) (Indian ruff)
 Psenopsis humerosa Munro, 1958 (Blackspot butterfish)
 Psenopsis intermedia Piotrovsky, 1987
 Psenopsis obscura Haedrich, 1967 (Obscure ruff)
 Psenopsis shojimai Ochiai & K. Mori, 1965

References

Centrolophidae
Taxa named by Theodore Gill